Desmond M Gwilliam (1954–1999), was a male boxer who competed for England.

Boxing career
Gwilliam won two national boys' club championships before winning the gold medal in the Dutch Multi-Nations tournament. He was then selected for England and represented England in the lightweight (-60 Kg) division, at the 1974 British Commonwealth Games in Christchurch, New Zealand. He was also a quarter-finalist in the European Championships in 1975.

He turned professional on 25 February 1977 and fought in 24 fights until 1983.

References

1954 births
1999 deaths
English male boxers
Boxers at the 1974 British Commonwealth Games
Lightweight boxers
Commonwealth Games competitors for England